The Motor Vessel Federal Fuji is a bulk carrier built in 1986, by Nippon Kokan in Shimizu, Japan. The ship was built for Viken Lakers, based in Bergen, Norway. The Federal Fuji was involved in a collision with the M/V Tecam Sea in the port of Sorel, Quebec on 27 April 2000. The squat effect phenomenon is believed to be a factor in the collision.

Between 1993 and 1994, Federal Fuji was caught illegally dumping oil off the Canadian coast. The ship was flying a German flag at the time, and her owners were fined $25,000.

References

1986 ships
Ships built in Japan
Bulk carriers